Belleville Airport (FAA LID: 43G) is a privately-owned, public-use airport located three miles southwest of Belleville, Michigan in Washtenaw County. It is owned and operated by Kenney Farmer. It is at an elevation of 696 feet. The airport was formerly named the Larsen Airpark. 

The airport has two runways. Runway 15/33 is 2,253 x 80 ft (687 x 24 m) and has a turf surface. Runway 18/36  is 2,157 x 160 ft (657 x 49 m) long and also has a turf surface.

For the 12-month period ending December 31, 2019, the airport has 504 aircraft operations per year, or 42 per month. It was composed entirely of general aviation. For the same time period, there are 9 aircraft based at the field: 7 single-engine airplanes and 2 ultralights.

References

Airports in Michigan
Airports in Washtenaw County, Michigan